Dmitri Andreyevich Golubev (born 5 January 1985) is a former Russian professional footballer.

Club career
He made his debut for FC Shinnik Yaroslavl on 3 July 2004 in an Intertoto Cup game against FK Teplice.

External links
 
 

1985 births
Footballers from Yaroslavl
Living people
Russian footballers
Association football defenders
FC Shinnik Yaroslavl players
FC Lukhovitsy players
FC Sheksna Cherepovets players
FC Dynamo Kirov players
FC Spartak Kostroma players